Neil Grayston is the name of:

Neil Grayston (actor), Canadian actor
Neil Grayston (footballer), English professional footballer